The Design 1019 ship (full name Emergency Fleet Corporation Design 1019) was a steel-hulled cargo ship design approved for mass production by the United States Shipping Boards Emergency Fleet Corporation (EFT) in World War I.

They were referred to as the "Ferris-type". Production was spread out over four shipyards: Atlantic Corporation of Portsmouth, New Hampshire (10 ships); Long Beach Shipbuilding Company of Long Beach, California (8 ships); Southwestern Shipbuilding of San Pedro, California (19 ships); and Western Pipe and Steel Company of San Francisco, California (18 ships). 54 ships were completed for the USSB in late 1919 through 1920. An additional ship was completed in 1920 for a private shipping company. Engines were a mixture of steam turbines, coal-fueled triple expansion engines, and oil fueled triple expansion engines.

References

Bibliography

External links
 EFC Design 1019: Illustrations

Standard ship types of the United States
Design 1019 ships
Design 1019 ships of the United States Navy